The Keizertimes is the weekly community newspaper of Keizer, Oregon, United States. It is produced on Fridays, and has a distribution of approximately 3,500, through the mail and newsstands.  Founded in 1979, the paper is published by Lyndon Zaitz, and is locally owned by Wheatland Publishing Corp.

References

External links
Official website
Keizertimes entry from the Oregon Newspaper Publishers Association

1979 establishments in Oregon
Keizer, Oregon
Newspapers published in Oregon
Oregon Newspaper Publishers Association
Newspapers established in 1979